Oliver Westerbeek (born February 8, 1966) is a German former professional footballer who played as a defender or midfielder.

Personal
Westerbeek works since 1999 as player agent for Rogon.

References

1966 births
Living people
Association football midfielders
German footballers
FC 08 Homburg players
VfL Bochum players
MSV Duisburg players
Karlsruher SC players
SC Fortuna Köln players
Bundesliga players